James William Lynd (November 25, 1830 – August 18, 1862) was a member of the Minnesota State Senate, elected 1861, and the first person killed in the initial action of the Dakota War of 1862. A historical marker stands at the site he was killed. The town of Lynd, Minnesota is named for him.

References

1830 births
1862 deaths
Minnesota state senators
19th-century American politicians